François Viens (born March 7, 1975) is a Canadian retired racquetball player from Delson, Quebec. Viens was a doubles specialist during his career usually playing on the right side. He won four Canadian Championships in doubles, three with Vincent Gagnon, with whom he also won the 2007 Pan American Championships and one with Corey Osborne.

International career 

Viens made 5 appearances on Team Canada. His first appearance was at the 2003  Pan American Games, when he earned a bronze medal in doubles with Corey Osborne.

Viens's greatest success internationally was winning the 2007 Pan American Championships in Santiago, Chile, where he and Vincent Gagnon defeated Americans Andy Hawthorne and Jason Samora in the final, 15-6, 11-15, 11-9.

Viens also played doubles with Tom O'Brien at the 2004 Pan American Championships, and they earned bronze medals, losing in the semi-finals to Americans Mike Dennison and Shane Vanderson, 15-8, 15-14.

Viens's last appearance on Team Canada was at the 2008  World Championships, when he played doubles with Kris Odegard. They lost to the Japanese team of Hiroshi Shimizu and Michimune Kono in the quarter finals, 2-15, 15-7, 11-6.

His other appearance for Canada was at the 2006 World Championships, when Viens played singles for the only time in his career. He reached the quarter finals, where he lost to Mexican Gilberto Meija.

Canadian career 

Viens won four Canadian Championships in doubles. His first title came in 2003 with Corey Osborne. That victory helped them get selected for that year's Pan American Games.

Viens's other Canadian titles have been with Vincent Gagnon. They won in 2008, beating Mike Green and Brian Istace in the final, and 2009, when they defeated Green and Eric Desrochers in the final. In 2012, Gagnon and Viens defeated Desrochers and Pedro Castro in the final, 15-8, 8-15, 11-9.

Personal

Viens is married and lives in Delson, Quebec.

See also

 List of racquetball players

References 

Canadian racquetball players
1975 births
Living people
Sportspeople from Ottawa
Pan American Games bronze medalists for Canada
Pan American Games medalists in racquetball
Racquetball in Canada
Racquetball players at the 2003 Pan American Games
Medalists at the 2003 Pan American Games